The cathedral of Notre Dame de Miséricorde, commonly known as Cotonou Cathedral, is a Roman Catholic cathedral, located near the Ancien Pont Bridge in Cotonou, Benin. It is noted for its distinct burgundy and white striped tiled architecture. Its tower stands towards the rear-end left side of the main building.

The cathedral is the seat of the Roman Catholic Archdiocese of Cotonou. The diocese was originally created on 26 June 1883 as the Apostolic Prefecture of Dahomey from the Apostolic Vicariate of Benin Coast, Nigeria. After several name changes under Dahomey, on 14 September 1955 it was promoted as the Metropolitan Archdiocese of Cotonou.

External links

Image at travelpod.com

Roman Catholic cathedrals in Benin
Buildings and structures in Cotonou